is a Japanese politician and bureaucrat from Mishima, Shizuoka. She was the first woman to be appointed vice-governor of Shizuoka Prefecture in 1996 and served one term in the House of Councillors in the National Diet from 2004 until 2009.

Early life and bureaucratic career
She graduated from the University of Tokyo with a Bachelor of Laws.

In 1972 Sakamoto joined the Ministry of Labor (now part of Ministry of Health, Labour and Welfare), serving in the Women Labourers' section of the Women's Bureau. She later transferred to the Employment Security Bureau, where she served as head of the policy section for employment of the disabled. In 1996 Sakamoto was seconded to the post of Vice-Governor of Shizuoka Prefecture, becoming the first woman vice-governor of the prefecture. She served in that role until 1999.

Following her term as Vice-Governor, Sakamoto returned to the Ministry and served as an Assistant Secretary to the Minister until 2001, then as head of the Occupational Health and Safety Department. Sakamoto finally served as head of the Human Resources Development Bureau from 2002 until her resignation from the ministry in 2004.

Political career
In July 2004 Sakamoto was elected to the House of Councillors as a Liberal Democratic Party candidate in the Shizuoka at-large district. Upon entering the Diet Sakamoto served on the House's Health, Welfare and Labour Committee and later in July 2007 was appointed as a director of the House's Budget Committee.

In August 2007 Sakamoto was appointed as a parliamentary secretary of Foreign Affairs in the cabinet of Prime Minister Shinzō Abe. However, immediately after her appointment an allegation concerning improper accounting of expenses was raised and led to Sakamoto resigning from the post one week after her appointment. She was replaced in the position by Masakatsu Koike.

In June 2009 Sakamoto resigned from the House of Councillors to contest the Shizuoka gubernatorial election the following month. Sakamoto contested the election as an independent candidate, but with the backing of the LDP and Komeito. Aware of the low popularity of the LDP's national government led by Prime Minister Tarō Asō, Sakamoto tried to distance herself from the party and ran on a campaign of the "prefecture people's party". Sakamoto received 713,654 votes (38.8%), but was defeated by Democratic Party candidate Heita Kawakatsu by a margin of 15,052 votes. The result was a precursor to the defeat of Aso and the LDP in the national general election held the following month.

References

Members of the House of Councillors (Japan)
Female members of the House of Councillors (Japan)
University of Tokyo alumni
Politicians from Shizuoka Prefecture
Living people
1949 births
Liberal Democratic Party (Japan) politicians